Yékini is the nickname of Yakhya Diop (26 February 1974 in Joal), a popular champion of Senegalese wrestling, the most prominent variant of the Lutte Traditionnelle, a West African folk tradition which has become a major professional sport in the last two decades. From the Serer ethnic group, Yékini is the most successful wrestler since the professionalisation of the sport, and his appearances are major news in his home country. His 2006 fight against and defeat of Mohamed Ndao, alias Tyson, was billed in Senegal as "the fight of the century", cementing the two as the best known exponents of the sport.  He was defeated by Balla Gaye 2, The Lion of Guédiawaye, at Stade Demba Diop on Sunday 22 April 2012, ending a reign that spanned almost two decades.

Yékini studied traditional "mbapatte" wrestling techniques before turning to the modern wrestling styles which include a mixture of boxing and wrestling.

References

 Yékini, la légende vivante de la lutte sénégalaise. Le lutteur invaincu depuis neuf ans (interview by David Cadasse, 17 February 2006) 
Sénégal LUTTE : 2007, année d’innovations, surprises et sacre. La Sentinelle (Dakar), 27 December 2007 
 Portions of this article were translated from the French language Wikipedia article :fr:Yékini, 2008-06-26.

External links

Lutte, Afrik News category for Lutte Traditionnelle newspaper reports. 
African Press Agency photos from 10 June 2007 Yekini vs Balla Beye rematch. 
Yekini, le roi des arènes - a comic book about his life and sport

Living people
1974 births
Senegalese wrestlers
Serer sportspeople